Bob Strait (born April 12, 1949) is an American stock car racing driver. He was one of the pioneer NASCAR SuperTruck Series drivers. He has sixteen ARCA victories.

Motorsports career results

NASCAR
(key) (Bold – Pole position awarded by qualifying time. Italics – Pole position earned by points standings or practice time. * – Most laps led.)

Winston Cup Series

Daytona 500

Craftsman Truck Series

ARCA Racing Series
(key) (Bold – Pole position awarded by qualifying time. Italics – Pole position earned by points standings or practice time. * – Most laps led.)

References

External links
 

1949 births
Living people
People from Mokena, Illinois
Racing drivers from Illinois
NASCAR drivers
ARCA Menards Series drivers
American Speed Association drivers